Dante Di Maso (Turin, 23 July 1924 – Turin, 2005) was an Italian football player and manager. Di Maso spent the vast majority of his career in Sicily where he was a prominent figure in the footballing scene, especially in relation to the island's most successful club, Palermo.

A winger, Di Maso scored 40 goals in Serie A with the rosanero shirt of Palermo. This record was broken in the 2009-10 season by Fabrizio Miccoli.

External links
Profile at Enciclopedia Del Calcio

Di Maso, Dante
Di Maso, Dante
Di Maso, Dante
Di Maso, Dante
Di Maso, Dante
Di Maso, Dante
Di Maso, Dante
Di Maso, Dante
Di Maso, Dante